Call signs in Russia are unique identifiers for telecommunications and broadcasting. Call signs are regulated internationally by the ITU as well as nationally by Ministry of Communications and Mass Media of the Russian Federation. The latter is responsible for providing policy on the allocation of Russia's radio spectrum to support efficient, reliable and responsive wireless telecommunications and broadcasting infrastructure.

In 1991 Russia inherited the largest portion of the former Soviet Union's allocated call signs.  The other post-USSR countries which inherited parts of the ITU UAA–UZZ call sign block are Uzbekistan, Kazakhstan, and Ukraine.

Call sign blocks for telecommunication
The International Telecommunication Union has assigned Russia the following call sign blocks for all radio communication, broadcasting or transmission:

While not directly related to call signs, the International Telecommunication Union (ITU) further has divided all countries assigned amateur radio prefixes into three regions; Russia is located in ITU Region 1.

Call sign assignments for amateur radio

Amateur radio or ham radio call signs are unique identifiers for the 24,000 licensed operators. 

Russia uses the following 1-letter and 2-letter prefixes in amateur radio call signs for normal operation: R, RA, RK, RN, RU, RV, RW, RX, RZ, and UA.  Any of these prefixes can be used in any of Russia's federal subjects.  The other prefixes are reserved for special operation.

It uses the numerals 1, 2, 3, 4, 5, 6, 7, 8, 9, and 0 to separate prefixes from suffixes, and to indicate in which of the six regions the amateur was assigned the call sign.

Russia uses the first letter of the suffix to designate a specific federal subject in each respective region.  This means that for most call signs the numeral and first letter of the suffix identifies which federal subject the operator was licensed in.

Northwest Russia

Central Russia

Volga River

North Caucusus

Urals and West Siberia

East Siberia and Pacific Coast

Combinations not listed are used by radio amateurs in the federal subject next to the listed combination immediately preceding it in the sort order; e.g., the 1B combination is used by radio amateurs in Saint Petersburg. Since 2010, call signs in the '3' region can also be issued with the numerals 2 and 5; in the '6' region with numeral 7; and in the '9' region with numeral 8.

Special call signs
 The second letter in a suffix: W, X, Y, Z – Club stations
 U1–4, 6, 9–0 World War II veterans
 U1MIR–U9MIR cosmonauts
 RI1ANA–RI1ANZ, RA00ANT–RI99ANT Antarctica, South Shetland Islands
 RI1FJA–RI1FJZ Franz Josef Land (Arctic)
 R1MVA–R1MVZ Maly Vysotsky Island (ex-4J1.)
 RA2, UA2–UI2 (F or K next letter) Kaliningrad Oblast
 R3ARES – Russian amateur radio emergency service H.Q (RARES), Moscow.
 RE0RAS – RARES, Regional service. Central Siberia, Krasnoyarsk.
 R3ARC – H.Q. Rescue service of Russian Red Cross. Moscow.
 R3RRC – "Russian Robinson Club" H.Q. Lipetsk city (R3G area).
 R3SRR – Russian Amateur Radio Union H.Q. Moscow.
 R3VHF – VHF Committee of Russian Amateur Radio Union.
 RS0ISS – Cosmonauts on the International Space Station.

History of call sign allocation

Russia was not a signatory to the 1913 Berlin agreement but received the R block series. Amateur radio was not yet developed enough to be subject to this identification scheme.

In 1927 the International Telecommunication Union Conference in Washington (D.C., USA) established internally agreed upon call sign prefixes – Russia was now in the USSR and the latter was assigned the RAA–RZZ block.

At the 1947 Atlantic City ITU Conference, the USSR was assigned the following call sign blocks:

As of 2010, several call sign codes were deleted or merged following the merger of the corresponding entity with a neighbouring subject of the Russian Federation between 2005 and 2008:
 9G (the Komi-Permyak Autonomous Okrug) merged with 9F (Perm Oblast) to become Perm Krai which uses both 9F and 9G
 8T (the Ust-Orda Buryat Autonomous Okrug) merged with 0S, 0T Irkutsk Oblast
 8V (the Agin-Buryat Autonomous Okrug) merged with 0U, 0V (Chita Oblast) to become Zabaykalsky Krai
 0B (the Taymyr Autonomous Okrug) and 0H (the Evenk Autonomous Okrug) merged with 0A (Krasnoyarsk Krai)
 0X (the Koryak Autonomous Okrug) merged with 0Z (Kamchatka Oblast) to become 0X, 0Z (Kamchatka Krai)

Japan/USSR Disputed areas – WWII
Sakhalin Island has been disputed between Russia/USSR and Japan since the mid-19th century. From 1905 until after World War II, South Sakhalin Island was under Japanese control and was assigned the JP7 call sign prefix for radio purposes. From 1945 until the present the call sign prefix for all of Sahalin Island is UA0, with F as the first letter of the suffix. The Japan-Soviet Joint Declaration of 1956 laid down that Habomai Is. and Shikotan I. should be returnable to Japan, but Russia is still the administrative authority in the Four Northern Islands.

Germany/USSR Disputed areas – WWII
While not strictly a Russian call sign issue, following World War II, Byelorussia inherited the DR–DT block at the Atlantic City Conference from the German D-block. The block was then transferred back to Germany, and the DS–DT block subsequently given to South Korea.

See also
 Amateur radio international operation
 Call signs
 ITU prefix - amateur and experimental stations
 Amateur radio license
 Russian Government Ministry of Communications resolution No 4 2012 - Regulation of Russian callsigns since 2012 (in Russian)

References

Russia
Communications in Russia
Mass media in Russia